Blowdown may refer to:

 Windthrow or forest blowdown, a felling of trees by windstorm
 Blowdown stack, a vertical containment structure at a refinery or chemical plant
 Boiler blowdown, a steam-boiler process to remove impurities
 Blowdown, a television series focusing on explosive demolition
  accidental pressure loss in a nuclear reactor pressure vessel